The 2015 Internationaux de Tennis de Blois was a professional tennis tournament played on clay courts. It was the third edition of the tournament which was part of the 2015 ATP Challenger Tour. It took place in Blois, France between 15 and 22 June 2015.

Singles main-draw entrants

Seeds

 1 Rankings are as of June 8, 2015.

Other entrants
The following players received wildcards into the singles main draw:
  Calvin Hemery
  Jaume Munar
  Stéphane Robert
  Johan Tatlot

The following players received entry into the singles main draw as an alternate:
  Pedro Sousa

The following players received entry from the qualifying draw:
  Rogério Dutra Silva
  Filip Peliwo
  Gleb Sakharov
  Maxime Tabatruong

The following players received entry into the singles main draw as a lucky loser:
  Gonzalo Escobar

Champions

Singles

  Mathias Bourgue def.  Daniel Muñoz de la Nava 2–6, 6–4, 6–2

Doubles

  Rémi Boutillier /  Maxime Teixeira  def.  Guilherme Clezar /  Nicolás Kicker 6–3, 4–6, [10–8]

External links
Official Website

Internationaux de Tennis de Blois
Internationaux de Tennis de Blois
Internationaux de Tennis de Blois